Trelawney was launched in 1809 at Whitby as a West Indiaman. She was wrecked on 22 January 1819.

Career
Trelawney first appeared in Lloyd's Register (LR) in 1811. However, in 1810, Trelawny, Bogg, master, was already trading with Jamaica.

Loss 
On 22 January 1819, Trelawney, Reid, master, was on her way from Greenock to Jamaica when she ran aground between Saltcoats and Irvin. Some of the cargo was saved. The location was near Stevenston, in the Bay of Irvine, Firth of Clyde.
  
Nineteen people died in the wrecking, including four men who lost their lives in the rescue attempt. Ten people were saved – five seamen and the five passengers.

Citations and references
Citations

References
 
 

1809 ships
Ships built in Whitby
Age of Sail merchant ships of England
Maritime incidents in 1819